Maids is a 2001 Brazilian film directed by Fernando Meirelles and Nando Olival. It is based on the play of the same name by Renata Melo, and has received multiple awards and nominations.

Cast 
 Cláudia Missura as Raimunda
 Graziela Moretto as Roxane
 Lena Roque as Créo
 Olivia Araújo as Quitéria
 Renata Melo as Cida
 Robson Nunes as Jailto
 Tiago Moraes as Gilvan
 Luís Miranda as Abreu
 Eduardo Estrela as Antônio
 Gero Camilo as Claudiney
 Charles Paraventi
 Milhem Cortaz

Reception
O Estado de S. Paulo praised the film as it differentiates itself from the original play and thus its humor does not rely on offending domestic workers. The reviewer also commended that rather than take a sociological approach, the film is aimed at the general public. Variety praised its cinematography as well as the cast, and further called it a "bright Brazilian comedy" that has "a wit and naturalness that Ken Loach's Bread and Roses might envy." Peter Bradshaw, writing for The Guardian said "it is indeed a little gem".

The film won the Best Cinematography Award and Missura, Moretto, Roque, Araújo and Melo shared the Best Supporting Actress Award at the 2001 Recife Film Festival. The five shared an award again at the Ceará Film Festival; this time a Best Actress Award, though. At the Natal Film Festival, Moraes won the Best Actor Award, Estrela won the Best Supporting Actor Award, and it won the Best Score Award. It won the Best Film Award at the Cuiabá Film Festival, where it also won the Best Screenplay and Best Newcomer (Moretto).

References

External links 
 

2001 films
2001 comedy-drama films
Brazilian comedy-drama films
Brazilian films based on plays
Films directed by Fernando Meirelles
Films shot in São Paulo
Films set in São Paulo
2000s Portuguese-language films
2001 comedy films
2001 drama films